Stig Brodersen (born August 1, 1984) is a Danish investor, author, and former college professor. He is the owner of the investment company Stig Brodersen Holding, and the co-founder and show host of The Investors Podcast.

Education 
Brodersen entered Aarhus University in 2005 to study Business and Managerial Economics. He received his bachelor's degree in 2008 and graduated from the said institution with a master's degree in Finance and International Business in 2010. He also took courses about Business Analysis at Harvard University.

Professional career 
While he was in graduate school, Brodersen co-founded the consultancy firm DinGæld ApS, which provided clients with legal and financial advice relating to personal finance. Upon getting his master's degree, he sold his shares in the firm and worked for Danske Commodities as an energy trader. There, he had a starting salary of almost 1 million Danish krone. However, he didn't like the accompanying lifestyle, which eventually prompted him to resign from the company after 18 months.

Brodersen then invested his time studying numerous value investors. He was especially drawn to Warren Buffett and his simple yet thorough investment strategy. While researching on the American billionaire, Brodersen met fellow Buffett enthusiast Preston Pysh online and decided to collaborate with him. This partnership resulted to 3 books; BuffettBooks.com, an educational site about how to invest like Warren Buffett; and The Investors Podcast, a podcast that studies billionaires and discusses the books those billionaires read. With more than 25 million downloads, The Investors Podcast was hailed by Business Insider as the number 1 finance-related podcast and was recommended by CNBC's Closing Bell as the number 1 investing podcast of 2016. Guests of the show have included: Howard Marks, Guy Spier, Tony Robbins and Mohnish Pabrai. Brodersen's own investing approach is heavily inspired by Warren Buffett and Benjamin Graham’s conservative value investing approach.

Brodersen taught financial management, economics, and accounting courses at Business Academy Aarhus from August 2013 to June 2017. He has been managing his own investment company Stig Brodersen Holding since January 2014.

In July 2018, Brodersen held the keynote at Investeerimisklubi, Estonia's largest investing conference.

Publications 
 The Intelligent Investor, A Summary of Benjamin Graham’s Original Work (2014)
 Warren Buffett Accounting Book (2014)
 Security Analysis, A Summary of Benjamin Graham and David Dodd’s Original Work (2014)

Health 
Stig has had a kidney transplant.

References

External links 
 Stig Brodersen’s Personal Website
 The Investor's Podcast Website

1984 births
Living people